Umbra is a genus of mudminnows native to Europe and North America.

Species
The currently recognized species in this genus are:
 Umbra krameri Walbaum, 1792 (European mudminnow)
 Umbra limi (Kirtland, 1840) (central mudminnow)
 Umbra pygmaea (DeKay, 1842) (eastern mudminnow)

References

 
Umbridae
Freshwater fish genera
Taxa named by Wilhelm Heinrich Kramer